St Cyprian's School is an independent (private) school for girls, in Grades 000 to 12, in Oranjezicht, Cape Town, Western Cape, South Africa. Full or weekly boarding is available to high school students. It is situated on the lower slopes of Table Mountain and has a scenic view. The school is also a member of the G20 Schools Group.

History 

It was founded in 1871 by the Rt Revd Robert Gray (bishop of Cape Town), the first Anglican bishop of Cape Town. The school has an Anglican foundation. The school practises its Anglican religion by having regular Eucharists, and weekly chapel services. St Cyprian's girls involve themselves in charity work around Cape Town.

St Cyprian's School is a member of the 'Round Square' international community of schools.

Its students sit the Independent Examinations Board (IEB) Examinations.

References

External links 

 

Anglican schools in South Africa
Boarding schools in South Africa
Schools in Cape Town
Private schools in the Western Cape
Educational institutions established in 1871
Girls' schools in South Africa
Round Square schools
1871 establishments in the Cape Colony